The LGBTQ+ Victory Fund (formerly the Gay & Lesbian Victory Fund), commonly shortened to Victory Fund, is an American political action committee dedicated to increasing the number of openly LGBTQ public officials in the United States. Victory Fund is the largest LGBTQ political action committee in the United States and one of the nation’s largest non-connected PACs.

Background
The Victory Fund was founded in 1991 as a non-partisan political action committee. It provides strategic, technical and financial support to openly gay, lesbian, bisexual, transgender, and queer candidates and officials across the United States running for all levels of government. Its partner organization, Victory Institute, offers programs and training to elected officials.

To be considered for endorsement, candidates must identify as LGBTQ, demonstrate community support and a realistic plan to win, demonstrate support of federal, state or local efforts to advance LGBTQ civil rights via the legislative or regulatory process, and demonstrate support of federal, state or local efforts to safeguard privacy and reproductive freedom. These requirements are less stringent for judicial endorsements.

Victory Fund employs a tiered system of endorsements. The categories are:
“Game Changer,” designating candidates who can become historic firsts and directly impact LGBTQ representation in the highest levels of government.
“Spotlight,” designating candidates who can make history or increase LGBTQ representation in low-equality states or in states with few or no LGBTQ lawmakers.
Non-designated candidates are candidates who will increase the number of LGBTQ voices in government.

Victory Fund and Victory Institute are led by a president-CEO and a team of staff based in Washington, D.C. The fund also has a board of directors, composed of top leaders of government, politics, and business. Additionally, the Victory Campaign Board is elected to recruit and endorse candidates, as well as provide financial resources.

History
Victory Fund was founded in 1991 by Vic Basile and William Waybourn, with Waybourn becoming its first executive director. It provides strategic, technical and financial support to openly gay, lesbian, bisexual and transgender candidates and officials across the United States, helping them win elections at local, state and federal levels. Victory has helped elect several hundred openly LGBT candidates to Congress, state legislatures, school boards and city councils. In addition, it works to help openly gay and lesbian officeholders develop professionally through its collaboration with the International Network of Lesbian and Gay Officials and co-sponsorship of the annual Gay & Lesbian Leadership Conference.

The group's founders, Dallas gay-rights activist William Waybourn and Human Rights Campaign Fund Executive Director Vic Basile, were inspired by the use of EMILY's List funds to power the 1990 election of former Governor of Texas Ann Richards. Waybourn and Basile planned an organization that would employ EMILY's List methodology—early money given sufficiently transforms "qualified candidates from 'fringe' status to 'front-runners'"—to propel gay and lesbian candidates to elected office.

Victory Fund endorses dozens of openly LGBT candidates each year, increasing exposure to potential donors and providing both strategic and material support. Past endorsees include Tammy Baldwin, Barney Frank, Sean Patrick Maloney, David Cicilline, Lupe Valdez, Victoria Kolakowski, Patricia Todd and Virginia Linder. The first candidate the Victory Fund endorsed was Sherry Harris, who was elected to the City Council in Seattle, Washington, in 1991, making her the first openly lesbian African-American elected official.

In 1995, Victory Fund was a principal organizer of a meeting between representatives of the Clinton administration and several dozen leaders of gay and lesbian organizations. This meeting followed on the heels of the Presidential Appointments Project, whose goal was getting openly gay people appointed to all levels of the Clinton administration (and subsequently, the Bush and Obama administrations).

In 1997, activist Brian Bond was hired as executive director of the Victory Fund from his position as the director of the Gay & Lesbian Leadership Council at the Democratic National Committee from to rebuild the nearly-bankrupt organization. He is credited by Tammy Baldwin with helping grow the visibility and size of the organization. He stepped down in 2003.

Former Victory Fund board member Chuck Wolfe was named executive director in 2003. Under his leadership, the organization's budgets grew exponentially.

In 2008, 80 of the group's 111 endorsed candidates won their elections.

In 2009, Victory Fund donated $40000 to the election of Annise Parker as mayor of Houston. In electing an out lesbian as its chief executive, Houston became the largest city in the country to have elected an openly gay person as mayor. Local gay groups, particularly the Houston GLBT Political Caucus, had nurtured Parker's political career and were openly supporting her race. The Victory Fund became a huge player in the race by providing a much-needed source of cash for Parker's grassroots efforts and helping her stay financially competitive with her two chief rivals, both of whose campaigns were lavishly funded. After the campaign, Parker referred to the Victory Fund as her "secret weapon" and thanked the organization for its help.

Chuck Wolfe stepped down as president of the organization at the end of 2014. In 2015, Aisha Moodie-Mills became the new president and CEO of the Victory Fund, which made her the first woman, first person of color and first lesbian to become the head of Victory Fund. In 2017, Moodie-Mills' departure was announced and the new president and CEO was named, former Houston Mayor Annise Parker.

In 2018, the Gay and Lesbian Victory Fund and Institute was renamed the LGBTQ Victory Fund and Institute to accurately reflect the environment in which it works.

In 2019, the Victory Fund announced it was endorsing Pete Buttigieg for president, which was its first presidential endorsement.

In 2022, Becca Balint won her Primary in part with $1 million from the Victory Fund, "putting her on a path to become" Vermont's first Congresswoman. After the Primaries, Victory Fund made 16 endorsements in Congressional Elections to expand LGBT Representation in Congress by eight (8) seats, or approximately six (6) million people.

On March 3, 2023 Victory Fund announced the addition of the "plus" in their name to be formally known as LGBTQ+ Victory Fund

Programs and events

International LGBTQ Leaders Conference
Victory Fund hosts a variety of events throughout the year. Its most prominent is the International LGBTQ Leaders Conference hosted in November and December, bringing elected officials from around the world for a weekend of panels, speakers, and receptions. This conference grew out of a joint conference in 2004 with the International Network of Lesbian and Gay Officials (INLGO). Victory Institute and NLGO merged in 2005.

U.S. gatherings
Victory Fund also hosts a number of champagne brunches and receptions around the United States, in cities such as Chicago, Kansas City, and San Diego. These bring together local officials and supporters and serve as fundraising for the organization.

Other events 
Other events include various pride receptions, including in Washington D.C. in June and in San Diego during July.

Victory Institute hosts events of its own as well as stewards several fellowship and internship programs. Events include LGBTQ Leadership Summits, which are day-long intensive trainings for LGBTQ leaders, and Candidate and Campaign Trainings, which are weekend long crash courses on how to run for office. The Institute also hosts international trainings, and has received funding from USAID.

The Victory Congressional Internship program brings LGBTQ college students to Washington, D.C. for an intensive leadership program, and includes an eight-week summer internship with an LGBTQ-friendly member of Congress. Participants also attend the International LGBTQ Leadership Conference.

The David Bohnett Victory Congressional Fellowship brings an emerging LGBTQ leader to Washington, D.C. for a year-long intensive fellowship that supports the executive director of the LGBTQ Congressional Equality Caucus. It also includes a generous stipend and access to the International LGBTQ Leadership Conference.

The Victory Empowerment Fellowship was implemented by Aisha Moodie-Mills and helps emerging LGBTQ leaders of color and transgender leaders expand their campaign skills and policy-making power through a year-long membership and access to a Candidate Campaign Training and the International LGBTQ Leadership Conference.

The Bohnett Leaders Fellowship brings senior-level executives working with state and local governments, including government officials and elected officeholders, to a three-week intensive Executive Education program at the Harvard Kennedy School of Government in Cambridge, Massachusetts.

The Presidential Appointments Initiative works with LGBTQ leaders and pro-equality presidential administrations to ensure LGBTQ people are included in the government.

Executive directors

Controversy among LGBT Republicans
The LGBTQ+ Victory Fund has attracted controversy from LGBT Republican politicians, such as Richard Grenell, the first openly gay person in the United States to hold a cabinet-level position who leveled criticism at their alleged bias against LGBT Republicans. The LGBTQ Victory fund donated over 100,000 dollars to candidates in the 2020 election cycle, and over $90,000 in the 2018 election cycle, with none of that money going to Republican candidates.

The organization's abortion stance has also come under scrutiny. Robert Turner, head of the D.C. Chapter of the Log Cabin Republicans wrote an op-ed for the Washington Blade criticizing the then-Gay & Lesbian Victory Fund's pro-choice litmus test as harmful to its goal of electing LGBT candidates. The Victory Fund, however, has said that its vision of the "Right to Privacy" can be as conservative as supporting abortion only in cases of rape and incest.

The LGBTQ Victory Fund refused to endorse Carl DeMaio, a gay Republican who ran for the House of Representatives in California. DeMaio also claims that the Victory Fund gave campaign documents of his, given as part of the Victory Fund's endorsement process, to his opponent.

Additionally, the Victory Fund has rejected the prospect of endorsing Caitlyn Jenner, a transgender woman running in the California gubernatorial race, citing her positions on transgender minors and athletes.

In the 2022 United States House of Representatives election in New York's third congressional district, the LGBTQ Victory Fund and Human Rights Campaign endorsed Democrat Robert Zimmerman over Republican nominee George Santos, in the first congressional race where both candidates were openly gay.

See also
 ProudPolitics, a similar group in Canada

Notes

Sources
 New York Times: 
 New York Times: Jeffrey Schmalz, "As Gay Marchers Gather, Mood Is Serious and Festive," April 25, 1993, accessed Dec. 9, 2009. "At a celebration lunch sponsored by the Victory Fund, half a dozen appointed and elected officials who had not previously been known to be gay made an appearance."

External links

 

LGBT political advocacy groups in the United States
United States political action committees
527 organizations
LGBT in Washington, D.C.
1991 establishments in the United States